Middlesex Center Methodist Church is a historic Methodist church located at Middlesex in Yates County, New York. It is a Romanesque style structure built about 1881.

It was listed on the National Register of Historic Places in 1994.

References

Churches on the National Register of Historic Places in New York (state)
Methodist churches in New York (state)
Churches completed in 1881
19th-century Methodist church buildings in the United States
Churches in Yates County, New York
National Register of Historic Places in Yates County, New York
1881 establishments in New York (state)